The Kozak memorandum, officially Russian Draft Memorandum on the Basic Principles of the State Structure of a United State in Moldova, was a 2003 proposal aimed at a final settlement of relations between Moldova and Transnistria and a solving of the Transnistria conflict. It was seen as an extension of the 1997 Moscow memorandum but was ultimately rejected by Moldovan president Vladimir Voronin.

The plan, presented in mid-November 2003 by Russia, was a detailed proposal for a united asymmetric federal Moldavian state. First published in Russian on the website of Transnistria's Ministry of Foreign Affairs, the text was promoted by a Russian politician Dmitry Kozak, a close ally of President Vladimir Putin and one of the key figures in his presidential team. For Transnistria, the memorandum presented an end to the previous Moscow policy, which assumed that the region would have equal status in federation with the rest of the country. According to the memorandum, Russian troops (no more than 2000 strong, without heavy armaments) would remain in Transnistria for the transitional period but not later than 2020.

It was proposed that the competencies of the government of federal Moldova would be divided into three categories: those of the federation, those of individual subjects, and those of joint competencies. The plan presented several issues risking causing a blockage in policy-making. A lower house, elected by proportional representation, would pass legislation by simple majority. All organic laws (pertaining to the change of the federal power structure - section 7b) would need the assent of the senate (not "all laws"), however, whose representation would be disproportionate with respect to population figures: 13 senators elected by the federal lower house, nine by Transnistria and four by Gagauzia. By 2004  Transnistria had 14% and Gagauzia 4% of Moldova's total population. By this plan, Transnistrian senators would be able to block changes to the constitution of the unified state.  Laws concerning the Federation (Moldova excluding Transnistria and Gagauzia) would not need ratification by the Senate.

Large demonstrations against the Kozak memorandum took place in Chișinău in the days following the publication of the Russian proposal. Moldova's leadership declined to sign the memorandum without coordination with the European organizations. A visit by President Putin to Moldova was canceled. Later in 2005, President Vladimir Voronin made a statement rejecting the 2003 Kozak memorandum because of contradiction with the Moldovan constitution which defines Moldova as a neutral state and could not allow any foreign troops on its soil, while the country cannot join military alliances. Moldova and the Kozak memorandum was a key issue at the Organization for Security and Co-operation in Europe ministerial meeting in Maastricht in December 2003, and disagreement between Russia on the one hand, and the EU and the US on the other on Moldova, was one of the principal reasons why a final joint declaration was not adopted after the meeting.

References

External links 
Kozak memorandum
Full text of Kozak memorandum 
Michael Emerson, Should the Transnistrian tail wag the Bessarabian dog? 
Pamela Hyde Smith, Moldova Matters: Why Progress is Still Possible on Ukraine Southwestern Flank
Nicu Popescu, The EU in Moldova – Settling conflicts in the neighbourhood, Institut d'Etudes de Sécurité de l'UE, Occasional Paper, No 60, Octobre 01, 2005

Memoranda
Transnistria conflict
Politics of Moldova
History of Transnistria since 1991
Proposed treaties
2003 in international relations
2003 in Transnistria